Heeralal Pannalal is a 1999 Indian Hindi language comedy film directed by Kawal Sharma, starring Mithun Chakraborty and Johnny Lever (both in double roles), Mohan Joshi, Shakti Kapoor and Pramod Moutho. This film was inspired on 1982 film Angoor starring Sanjiv Kumar and Deven Verma and 1998 movie Bade Miyan Chote Miyan starring Govinda and Amitab Bachan in pivotal roles. Mithun Chakraborty's voice was dubbed by dubbing artist. The film was Disaster at boxoffice.

Plot
Heeralal Pannalal is a comedy entertainer with Mithun and Johnny starring in Parallel roles. It is the story of "two sets" of "twins" and both have been named "Heeralal" and "Pannalal"; they set out in search of love and adventure, but they are quite unaware of the presence of the other "set" of Heeralal and Pannalal.

Cast
 Mithun Chakraborty as Heera Lal/Himself (double role) 
 Johnny Lever as Pannalal/Himself (double role)
 Mohan Joshi as Motiwala's Brother
 Shakti Kapoor as Motiwala's Elder Brother		
 Maleeka R Ghai as Police Commissioner's Daughter
 Asrani as Constable Chaurasia
 Deven Verma as Mangalbhai
 Padmini Kapila as Mangalbhai's wife
 Raju Kher as Police Commissioner
 Pramod Moutho as S.K. Motiwala 
 Razak Khan as Babu
 Arun Bakshi as Pandit (in song "Aaya Sherawali")
 Rana Jung Bahadur as Natwar (as Ranajung Bahadur)
 Benu Kalsi as (as Binu Kalsi)
 Ghanshyam Rohera as Stage Show Organiser
 Veerendra Saxena
 Payal Malhotra
 Anu
 Dakshana
 Raj Tilak

Music

References

External links
 

1999 films
1990s Hindi-language films
Mithun's Dream Factory films
Films shot in Ooty
Films scored by Anand Raj Anand
Films directed by Kawal Sharma